Father of My Children is a 2009 French drama film directed by Mia Hansen-Løve. It won the Jury Special Prize in the Un Certain Regard section at the 2009 Cannes Film Festival. It is based in part on the life of the late Humbert Balsan.

Plot
Grégoire Canvel is a French film producer who has his own film company. Despite his luxurious country home, apartment in Paris and film company he is drowning in debt. Grégoire continues to take on more work despite his slate of current films continuing to rack up costs. Upon learning that he is 4 million euros in debt and that his catalogue of films, already mortgaged, is only worth less than a million euros and that his bank refuses to extend him any more credit Grégoire burns his bills and then shoots himself in the street.

In the wake of his death his wife Sylvia attempts to honour her husband's memory by completing the work currently in production. However her attempts fail and she is forced to liquidate the company.

Meanwhile, while waiting for her mother outside of the production office, Grégoire and Sylvia's eldest daughter,  Clémence, overhears people talking about her father and how he led a double life and had a son from whom he was estranged. While Sylvia is in Sweden trying to secure funding for one of Grégoire's last films, Clémence digs through her fathers papers and discovers he did have a son named Moune to whom he sent money. Though she meets with Moune's mother, Isabelle, she ultimately does not meet Moune himself.

On the day the company is dissolved, Sylvia and her three daughters go to Grégoire's office one final time. Afterwards they leave Paris and though Clémence had wanted to visit her father's grave in order to say goodbye, her mother tells her there is simply no time. In the backseat of the car Clémence begins to cry as they pass through the city.

Cast
Louis-Do de Lencquesaing as Grégoire Canvel
Alice de Lencquesaing as Clémence
Michaël Abiteboul as The banker
Chiara Caselli as Sylvia Canvel
Manelle Driss as Billie Canvel
Sandrine Dumas as Valérie
Eric Elmosnino as Serge

Production
Hansen-Løve based the character of Grégoire on Humbert Balsan whom she had met after she had made her first short film and who had originally intended to produce her first film All Is Forgiven before he committed suicide.

She cast her cousin Igor Hansen-Løve in the role of Arthur Malkavian, a young screen writer whose film Grégoire wants to produce, giving him an experience similar to her own with  Humbert Balsan.

Reception
Father of My Children has a rating of 76 on Metacritic and 91% on Rotten Tomatoes indicating widespread positive acclaim.

Accolades

References

External links
 

2009 films
2009 drama films
2000s French-language films
French drama films
Films directed by Mia Hansen-Løve
Films about suicide
Films set in Paris
Films about film directors and producers
2000s French films